Stenodactylus slevini,  also known commonly as Slevin's sand gecko or Slevin's short-fingered gecko, is a species of lizard in the family Gekkonidae. The species is native to Western Asia.

Etymology
The specific name, slevini, is in honor of American herpetologist Joseph Richard Slevin.

Geographic range

S. slevini is found in Bahrain, southern Iraq, southern Jordan, Kuwait, Qatar, northwestern Saudi Arabia, western United Arab Emirates, and Yemen.

Habitat

Description

Reproduction
S. slevini is oviparous.

References

Further reading
Arnold EN (1980). "Reptiles of Saudi Arabia. A review of the lizard genus Stenodactylus (Reptilia: Gekkonidae)". Fauna of Saudi Arabia 2: 368–404. (Stenodactylus slevini, p. 393).
Disi AM, Modrý D, Nečas P, Rifai L (2001). Amphibians and Reptiles of the Hashemite Kingdom of Jordan. Frankfurt am Main, Germany: Chimaira. 408 pp. .
Haas G (1957). "Some Amphibians and Reptiles from Arabia". Proceedings of the California Academy of Sciences, Fourth Series 29: 47–86. (Stenodactylus slevini, new species, pp. 54–56, Figure 3; S. arabicus, new species, pp. 56–57, Figure 4).
Rösler H (2008). "Kommentierte Liste der rezent, subrezent und fossil bekannte Geckotaxa (Reptilia: Gekkonomorpha)". Gekkota 2: 28–153. (Stenodactylus slevini, p. 115). (in German).
Sindaco R, Jeremčenko V (2008). The Reptiles of the Western Palearctic. 1. Annotated Checklist and Distributional Atlas of the Turtles, Crocodiles, Amphisbaenians and Lizards of Europe, North Africa, Middle East and Central Asia. (Monogrphs of the Societas Herpetologica Italica). Latina, Italy: Edizioni Belvedere. 580 pp. .

slevini
Reptiles described in 1957